Japan Breeding farms' Cup Classic (ジャパンブリーディングファームズカップクラシック) is an annual race that is usually held on November 3, the national holiday Culture Day.  This race and the JBC sprint were started in 2001, following American the Breeders' Cup, though the JBC has only two category race. In 2011, JBC Lady's Classic was added for fillies and mares.

The track is changed yearly like the American Breeders' Cup, so that the distances may differ.  The distance was 2,000 meters from 2001 to 2004, in 2007 and 2011; 1,900 meters in 2005 and 2009; 2,100 meters in 2006; 1,870 meters in 2008; and 1800 meters in 2010. In both 2012 and the following year, it will be 2,100 meters.

This is the highest-prized race in National Association of Racing (NAR), and the third highest-prized dirt event in Japan, following Champions Cup and February Stakes both organized by Japan Racing Association(JRA). Until 2011, the winner's prize was one hundred million yen. Although its prize money is high, this race is regarded as preparation for Champions Cup.

Until year 2017, all winners were come from the JRA instead of organizer NAR.

Winners

Open middle distance horse races
Horse races in Japan
Dirt races in Japan